"Gideon Rises" is the twentieth aired episode of the animated television series Gravity Falls and the final episode of the series' first season. Premiering on August 2, 2013, on the Disney Channel, it was directed by John Aoshima and Joe Pitt, and written by Alex Hirsch, Matt Chapman, and Michael Rianda.

The series follows twins, Dipper (voiced by Jason Ritter) and Mabel (voiced by Kristen Schaal), as they spend their summer vacation at their great uncle's tourist trap, where they are introduced to the paranormal side of the town Gravity Falls. The episode is the second of the two-part finale of the first season. It continues the plot from the previous episode "Dreamscaperers", and sees Dipper and Mabel, alongside their great uncle Stan (voiced by Alex Hirsch), and friend Soos (voiced by Alex Hirsch), as they try to get back their stolen house from their nemesis Gideon Gleeful (voiced by Thurop Van Orman).

The episode received a viewership of 3.2 million. "Gideon Rises" was released for digital distribution as part of the series Volume 2.

Plot summary 
Gideon Gleeful has taken control of the Mystery Shack, forcing the Pines family to move in with Soos at his grandmother's house. At a press conference, Gideon announces his intentions to turn the Mystery Shack into his own personal theme park, Gideonland, which the Pines family see on television. After failing to convince the town of Gideon's true nature, Mabel worries about where are they going to stay if they don't get the Mystery Shack back. Meanwhile, at the Mystery Shack, Gideon reveals to his father the true nature of his book; the story reads that it was written a long time ago by a brilliant unknown author who learned the secrets of Gravity Falls, secrets too powerful for one man, and hid the journals where no one could find them, knowing that when the journals are brought together, it would lead to a gateway of "unimaginable power". However, he is unaware that there are three journals and not two. Gideon says that codes and maps from the journal have led him to believe that the other book is hidden somewhere on the Mystery Shack's property.

Meanwhile, Dipper and Mabel are told that they are heading on the next bus out of Gravity Falls. With advice from their own journal, Journal 3, they soon come up with a plan: assembling the gnomes that had tried to kidnap Mabel at the beginning of the summer to try to take back the shack, but the gnomes are stopped by Gideon's pig whistle. As the gnomes grab a hold of both Dipper and Mabel, Dipper drops the third journal, and Gideon takes it from him. Dipper and Mabel then leave the town on the bus. Back at the Mystery Shack, Gideon is overjoyed to have the journal he stole from Dipper, until discovering it is the journal number 3 to his dismay. Believing that Dipper is trying to get the first out of town, Gideon takes a giant robot look-alike and goes after their bus.

Upon watching the Gideon-bot, Dipper and Mabel tell the bus driver, Soos, to run. Gideon chases and corners the bus at the edge of a cliff. Dipper and Mabel escape the bus, but Gideon corners them. Gideon grabs Mabel and throws Dipper aside, planning to rule Gravity Falls with Mabel as his queen. Dipper jumps off the cliff into the Gideon-bot, where he and Gideon start to fight, with Dipper beating Gideon. However, the bot loses balance and falls off the bridge, but Mabel and Dipper are saved by Mabel's grappling hook. A large crowd surrounds the robot, to which Gideon lies that Dipper and Mabel tried to kill him. As the police get ready to arrest Dipper and Mabel, Stan shows up and reveals that Gideon is a fraud; he uses hidden video cameras inside the pins he gives out to spy on the local citizens. The police arrest Gideon after the townspeople turn against him, and Stan takes the deed and Journal 2 from him. The Pines return to the Mystery Shack and start settling their things back in their room, when Stan goes to check on them. Dipper and Mabel tell Stan that they were talking, and they wanted to show Stan the journal, exclaiming that they finally trust him. Stan laughs, crediting everything the twins told him to be a result of reading the book, and takes it to Dipper's disappointment, but Mabel cheers him up and the twins have a water fight with Soos.

Later that night, Stan takes Journal 3 and later opens a hidden passage door behind the Mystery Shack vending machine. He walks into a hidden laboratory and goes down an elevator. Revealing that he was the one with ownership of Journal 1, he places the three books together with each opened at a specific page revealing the blueprint for a machine. He uses codes from the pages to activate the machine. As the episode closes, he merely says "Here we go!".

Reception 

"Gideon Rises" was released on August 2, 2013, as the last episode of the Gravity Falls first season and received a viewership of 3.2 million in the United States. The episode was nominated for a Golden Reel Award under the category Best Sound Editing - Sound Effects, Foley, Dialogue and ADR Animation in Television. The A.V. Club gave the episode a grade of "A", concluding "No single half-hour could wrap up all the questions Gravity Falls has raised over this season, but this episode shows an impressive knack for knowing which questions need answering and which can be safely ignored. And the biggest question it answers isn’t even really on the radar until the final minutes of the episode, as Stan finally reveals just how much he's been fooling everyone all this time. Alex Hirsch nails Stan's reaction to being presented with Dipper's journal, as he can’t quite mask his initial, genuine excitement before returning to his oblivious disguise. It's still not at all clear where this is all headed towards, but the show appears on the verge of changing irrevocably."

International airdates
 October 9, 2013: Switzerland
 November 26, 2013: Germany
 March 14, 2014: Austria

References

External links
 Gideon Rises at IMDb

Gravity Falls episodes
2013 American television episodes
Television episodes about robots